Euaresta meridionalis is a species of fruit fly in the genus Euaresta of the family Tephritidae.

References

Tephritinae
Insects described in 1952
Diptera of South America